The 2010 Rutgers Scarlet Knights football team represented Rutgers University in the 2010 NCAA Division I FBS college football season. The Scarlet Knights were led by head coach Greg Schiano in his 10th season. They played their home games at Rutgers Stadium and are members of the Big East Conference. They finished the season 4–8, 1–6 in Big East play.

Schedule

During the season
During the October 16 game vs Army, defensive tackle Eric LeGrand suffered a spinal cord injury. He underwent emergency surgery to stabilize his spine at Hackensack University Medical Center. He is paralyzed from the neck down, but has regained sensation throughout his body, which might lead to a more complete recovery.

This tragedy clearly affected the team's play: While they held on to defeat Army and raise their record to 4-2, when in the aftermath of that game the extent of LeGrand's injury became apparent, it contributed to sending RU into a funk that resulted in a six-game losing streak to end the season.

References

Rutgers
Rutgers Scarlet Knights football seasons
Rutgers Scarlet Knights football